Lucio Filomeno (born 8 May 1980) is a former Argentine footballer who played as a striker. His last club was Acassuso. After growing up in Haedo, Buenos Aires, Filomeno played for a variety of clubs around the world and also for the Argentina U-16 national team.

Club career
Filomeno made his professional debut in March 1996 playing for Nueva Chicago and being still 15 years old. He was one of the youngest players to this day to start playing professionally in Argentina. He was then noticed by English club Newcastle United F.C. and made his first move to Europe. He did not play officially for Newcastle and moved to Italy where he signed first for Udinese and then for Inter Milan. A year later he returned to Argentina to join San Lorenzo de Almagro where he contributed to the club winning of the Argentine "Torneo Clausura" 2001 and the Southamerican "Copa Mercosur" 2001.
Subsequently, he moved to Mexico where he joined Jaguares de Chiapas in their inaugural 2002 season, scoring the team's first goal ever in a 3–1 loss to Tigres.

In 2005, he joined South Korean side Busan IPark in K League 1, but he appeared in only League Cup 8 matches. A brief spell at D.C. United followed where he struggled to play for the first team and only scored once.

In 2006, he returned to Argentina to join his original club, Nueva Chicago. 
In the summer of 2007 he was signed by Greek first division club Asteras Tripolis and in June 2009 he was picked up on a two-year deal by Greek club PAOK FC.
He had signed a one-year deal with Atlético de Rafaela of the Argentinian first division on August 4, 2011. He played for one season and then he stopped. In summer 2013, he signed with Acassuso playing in Primera B Metropolitana, the regionalised third division of the Argentine football league system.

Honors
D.C. United
 Major League Soccer Supporter's Shield: 2006

References

External links

 

1980 births
Living people
Argentine footballers
Udinese Calcio players
Inter Milan players
Nueva Chicago footballers
San Lorenzo de Almagro footballers
D.C. United players
Asteras Tripolis F.C. players
PAOK FC players
Footballers from Buenos Aires
Argentine expatriate sportspeople in South Korea
Chiapas F.C. footballers
K League 1 players
Busan IPark players
Argentine Primera División players
Super League Greece players
Liga MX players
Argentine expatriate footballers
Expatriate footballers in Italy
Expatriate footballers in Greece
Expatriate footballers in Mexico
Expatriate footballers in South Korea
Expatriate soccer players in the United States
Major League Soccer players
Atlético de Rafaela footballers
Association football forwards